Blasphemy are a Canadian black metal band based in Vancouver, British Columbia.

History
Blasphemy formed in 1984. The band released a demo titled Blood Upon the Altar in 1989 and their debut album, Fallen Angel of Doom, the following year through Wild Rags, a record label they had signed to while touring the United States.

Their second full-length studio album was the 1993 Gods of War released through Osmose Productions. In 1993, Blasphemy also took part in the "Fuck Christ Tour" and toured through Europe with Immortal and Rotting Christ.

Blasphemy was then inactive for several years. Ryan Förster joined the band in 1999. The band's July 2001 concert in Vancouver was released as a live album titled Live Ritual – Friday the 13th in 2002.

They were inactive again until 2009, when they played two concerts; one in Montreal and one in Helsinki, in the Black Flames of Blasphemy festival, with Proclamation, Black Witchery, Revenge and Archgoat. In 2010, Blasphemy headlined the second installation of the Nuclear War Now! festival in Germany.

Blasphemy's song "War Command" has been covered by Beherit and the cover appeared on Beherit's 1999 compilation album Beast of Beherit - Complete Worxxx. Blasphemy's "Winds of the Black Gods" was the opening track on the 2004 compilation Fenriz Presents... The Best of Old-School Black Metal.

Members
Current line-up
 Nocturnal Grave Desecrator and Black Winds – vocals, bass and formerly guitars
 Caller of the Storms – guitars
 Deathlord of Abomination and War Apocalypse – guitars
 Three Black Hearts of Damnation and Impurity – drums

Session and live performers
 V.K. – live session bass

Former members
 Ace Gestapo Necrosleezer and Vaginal Commands – bass
 Black Priest of 7 Satanic Rituals – guitars
 The Traditional Sodomizer of the Goddess of Perversity – guitars
 Bestial Saviour of the Undead Legions – bass and backing vocals

Timeline

Discography

Studio albums
 Fallen Angel of Doom.... (1990)
 Gods of War (1993)

Live albums
 Live Ritual – Friday the 13th (2001)
 Desecration of São Paulo - Live in Brazilian Ritual Third Attack (2016)
 Victory (Son of the Damned) (2018)

Demo albums
 Blood Upon the Altar (1989)
 Die Hard Rehearsal (2001)
 Blood Upon the Soundscape (2018)

References

External links
[ Blasphemy] at Allmusic
Blasphemy at Discogs

Canadian black metal musical groups
Canadian death metal musical groups
Blackened death metal musical groups
Musical groups established in 1984
Musical quintets
1984 establishments in British Columbia